Bokungu Airport  is an airport serving locality of Bokungu in Tshuapa Province, Democratic Republic of the Congo.

See also

 Transport in the Democratic Republic of the Congo
 List of airports in the Democratic Republic of the Congo

References

External links
OpenStreetMap - Bokungu Airport
 OurAirports - Bokungu
 FallingRain - Bokungu Airport

Airports in Tshuapa Province